Sham Lal (1912 – 23 February 2007, in Delhi) was an Indian literary critic and journalist, who served as the editor of The Times of India. He wrote a column Life and Letters for several years for Hindustan Times and later The Times of India. Rudrangshu Mukherjee has described him as the most erudite newspaper editor in India.

Sham worked with The Yashpal Times from 1934 to 1948. He joined The Times of India in 1950 as assistant editor. He later served as the editor from 1967 to 1978. After his retirement, he continued as a columnist for The Times of India. In 1994, he moved his column to The Telegraph.

Quotes
 On eminent historian, R.S. Sharma, "R.S. Sharma, a perceptive Historian of Ancient India, has too great a regard for the truth about the social evolution in India over a period of two thousand years, stretching from 1500 BC to 500 AD, to take refuge in a world of make-believe.  
 On Octavio Paz, Poetic activity is born of desperation in the face of the impotence of the word and ends in the recognition of the omnipotence of silence
 "At a time when political rag chewing, hack writing, mass media banalities and high pressure sales talk do as much to corrupt the language as industrial wastes to pollute air and water, it is the poet’s job to preserve the integrity of the written word."

Obituaries
Prime Minister Dr. Manmohan Singh, in a condolence message, remembered Mr. Sham Lal as a "great editor, a thoughtful writer and a voice of reason, liberal values and patriotism." Describing him as a "media icon of my generation," Dr. Singh said: "Generations of his readers looked forward to reading his columns for his wit and wisdom and his erudition. I hope his inspiring example will continue to guide Indian journalism." The former Prime Minister, H.D. Deve Gowda, remembered Mr. Sham Lal as an intellectual giant who was passionate about all aspects of life, particularly art, films and books. "He was an institution in himself. His death has left a void difficult to fill and his contributions to Indian journalism will continue to educate and inspire generations of media persons."

Books
Sham Lal has these books to his credit
1. A Hundred Encounters 

2. Indian Realities 
 
 http://www.tribuneindia.com/2003/20031214/spectrum/book5.htm

References

External links
 Obituary in The Telegraph
 http://www.biblio-india.org/trib.asp?mp=MA07 in Biblio: A Review of Books

1912 births
2007 deaths
The Times of India journalists
Indian literary critics
20th-century Indian journalists
Indian male journalists
Journalists from Delhi